Perbrinckia fenestra is a species of freshwater crabs of the family Gecarcinucidae that is endemic to Sri Lanka. the species is categorized as vulnerable by founders due to their single locality where tourist destinations are abundant. The site is Batatotalena Cave in Kuruwita. It is rarely found, and known to live under moist rocks, near water sources and under wet litter.

References

Gecarcinucoidea
Freshwater crustaceans of Asia
Crustaceans of Sri Lanka
Endemic fauna of Sri Lanka
Crustaceans described in 2005